This is a list of authors whose works enter the public domain in part of the world in 2015.

Entering the public domain in Europe 
A work enters the public domain in most European countries (with the exception of Belarus) 70 years after the creator's death, if it was published during the author's lifetime.In 1995,the European union extended copyright from life+50 to life+70 and that had the effect of extending copyrights that had already expired,this way authors that died in 1944 and entered the public Domain in 1995 entered the public domain again in 2015.

Sortable list

Entering the public domain in countries with life + 50 years
In most countries of Africa and Asia, as well as Belarus, Bolivia, Canada, New Zealand and Uruguay; a work enters the public domain 50 years after the creator's death.

Writers
January 17 – T. H. White, English novelist (heart condition, born 1906)
February 3 – Clarence Irving Lewis, American philosopher (born 1883)
February 25 – Grace Metalious (Marie Grace DeRepentigny), American novelist (cirrhosis of liver, born 1924)
March 17 – Păstorel Teodoreanu, Romanian poet and satirist (lung cancer, born 1894)
March 20 – Brendan Behan, Irish playwright, poet and writer (born 1923)
April 14 – Rachel Carson, American environmentalist (breast cancer, born 1907)
April 18 – Ben Hecht, American screenwriter (born 1894)
April 23 – Karl Polanyi (Károly Polányi), Austro-Hungarian economic historian and social philosopher (born 1886)
May 13 – Hamilton Basso, American novelist and journalist (born 1904)
July 6 – Ion Vinea, Romanian poet, novelist, and journalist (cancer, born 1895)
August 3 – Flannery O'Connor, American essayist and fiction writer (born 1925)
August 12 – Ian Fleming, English spy thriller writer (heart attack, born 1908)
August 17 – Mihai Ralea, Romanian critic and sociologist of literature (born 1896)
September 14 – Vasily Grossman, Soviet novelist (cancer, born 1905)
September 18 – Seán O'Casey, Irish dramatist and memoirist (born 1880)
November 21 – Leah Bodine Drake, American poet, editor and critic (cancer, born 1914)
November 29 – Anne de Vries, Dutch novelist (born 1904)
December 9 – Dame Edith Sitwell, English poet and critic (born 1887)
December 21 – Carl Van Vechten, American writer and photographer (born 1880)
Unknown date – Radu D. Rosetti, Romanian poet and playwright (born 1874)

Artists
 January 1 – Paul Ninas, American painter (b. 1903)
 January 17 – Đorđe Andrejević Kun, Serbian painter (b. 1904)
 January 26 – Xawery Dunikowski, sculptor (b. 1875)
 February 25 – Alexander Archipenko, sculptor (b. 1887)
 February 27 – Orry-Kelly, costume designer (b. 1897; liver cancer)
 March 12 – Jovan Bijelić, Serbian painter (b. 1884)
 March 28 – Vlastislav Hofman, painter, architect (b. 1884)
 April 4 – Seán O'Sullivan, portrait painter (b. 1906)
 April 20 – August Sander, photographer (b. 1876)
 May 9 – Rico Lebrun, Italian-American painter and sculptor (b. 1900)
 June 18 – Giorgio Morandi, still life painter (b. 1890)
 June 24 – Stuart Davis, painter (b. 1892)
 June 26 – Gerrit Rietveld, designer and architect
 July 21 – Jean Fautrier, painter and sculptor (b. 1898)
 August 31 – Peter Lanyon, landscape painter (b. 1918)
 November 5 – Mabel Lucie Attwell, English illustrator (b. 1879)
 December 29 – Vladimir Favorsky, Russian graphic artist (b. 1886)
 unknown date – Tanasko Milovich, Serbian painter (b. 1900)

Writers
 April 18 – S. Anantharamakrishnan, Indian business tycoon

See also
 2012 in public domain
 2013 in public domain
 2014 in public domain
 2016 in public domain
 2017 in public domain
 2018 in public domain
 2019 in public domain
 2020 in public domain
 2021 in public domain
 2022 in public domain
 Creative Commons
 Public Domain Day
 List of countries' copyright lengths
 Public Domain
 1944 in literature, 1954 in literature, 1964 in literature, and 1974 in literature for writers who died in those years
 Over 300 public domain authors available in Wikisource (any language), with descriptions from Wikidata

External links
 List of authors who died in 1944 (see also Talk:2015 in public domain)

References

Public domain
Public domain